Kurgashla (Qurğaşlı) is a rural locality (a village) in Tashbukanovsky Selsoviet, Gafuriysky District, Bashkortostan, Russia. The population was 280 as of 2010. There are 13 streets.

Geography 
Kurgashla is located 16 km southeast of Krasnousolsky (the district's administrative centre) by road. Verkhny Tashbukan is the nearest rural locality.

References 

Rural localities in Gafuriysky District